Croes is a Dutch-language surname. It is one of the most common surnames in Aruba. People with this name include:
 Betico Croes (1938–1986), Aruban politician
 Evelyn Wever-Croes (1966), Aruban politician, First Female Prime Minister of Aruba
 Francois Croes (born 1990), Aruban football player
 Frido Croes (1957–2020), Aruban politician
 Hildward Croes (1962–2014), Aruban musician
 Mito Croes (1946–2016), Aruban politician
 Paul Croes (born 1976), Aruban politician

See also 
 Kroes

Dutch-language surnames